Chestnut Grove is an unincorporated community in Stokes County, North Carolina, United States, approximately three miles north-northwest of King.

Unincorporated communities in Stokes County, North Carolina
Unincorporated communities in North Carolina